The 2007 Great Alaska Shootout was held from November 20, 2007, through November 24, 2007 at Sullivan Arena in Anchorage, Alaska

Brackets 
* – Denotes overtime period

Men's

Women's

References

Great Alaska Shootout
Great Alaska Shootout
Great Alaska Shootout
Great Alaska Shootout
Great Alaska Shootout